This a list of stitches used in hand and machine sewing.

Types of machine stitches
Lockstitch
Chain stitch
Zigzag stitch
Running stitch
Back stitch
Satin stitch
Overlock stitch

Types of hand stitches
Back tack – backward stitch to anchor tacking or basting
Backstitch – sturdy hand stitch for seams and decoration
Basting stitch (US) – for reinforcement or for temporarily holding fabric in place (same as tacking stitch)
Blanket stitch – used to finish an unhemmed blanket
Blind stitch (or hemstitch) – type of slip stitch used for inconspicuous hem
Buttonhole stitch – for reinforcing buttonholes and preventing cut fabric from raveling
Chain stitch – hand or machine stitch for seams or decoration
Cross-stitch – usually used for decoration, but may also be used for seams
Catch stitch (also 'flat' and 'blind' -catch stitch) – flat looped stitch used in hemming
Darning stitch – for repairing holes or worn areas in fabric or knitting
Embroidery stitch – one or more stitches forming a figure of recognizable appearance
Hemstitch (Hemming stitch) – decorative technique for embellishing the hem of clothing or household linens
Overcast stitch – used to enclose a raw, or unfinished, seam or edge
Pad stitch – secures two or more layers of fabric together and provide firmness
Pick stitch – hand stitch that catches only a few threads on the wrong side of the fabric, difficult to produce nicely so typically used for hemming high quality garments
Running stitch – hand stitch for seams and gathering
Sailmaker's stitch – may refer to any of the hand stitches used for stitching canvas sails, including the flat stitch, round stitch, baseball stitch, herringbone stitch.
Slip stitch – form of blind stitch for fastening two pieces of fabric together from the right side without the thread showing
Stoating – used to join two pieces of woven material, such that the resulting stitches are not visible from the right side of the cloth
Straight stitch – the basic stitch in hand-sewing and embroidery
Tacking stitch (UK, also baste or pin) – quick, temporary stitching intended to be removed
Tent stitch – diagonal embroidery stitch at a 45-degree angle
Topstitch – used on garment edges such as necklines and hems, helps facings stay in place and gives a crisp edge
Whipstitch – for protecting edges
Ladder stitch or mattress stitch – for invisibly closing seams from the outside, i.e. to close a pillow after being stuffed

See also
List of sewing machine brands

References
Sarah’s Hand Embroidery Tutorials (2019). Hand Embroidery Stitches for Everyone. .